Thomas Daniel Chapman (31 October 1815 – 17 February 1884) was the Premier of Tasmania from 2 August 1861 until 20 January 1863. He served as a member of the Tasmanian Parliament for 26 years from August 1856 until his death in 1884.

Early life
Chapman immigrated to Tasmania at around 1841 with his younger brother George (George returned to England after having married in Tasmania). He set up a business in Hobart and became a leading merchant during the early 1850s. He married Catherine Swan and had four daughters and five sons. Chapman was an advocate against the transportation of convicts to Van Diemens Land (Tasmania).

Political career
Chapman was first elected to the Tasmanian Legislative Council in 1851. When the Tasmanian House of Assembly was created in 1856 Chapman became a minister under Tasmania's first responsible government headed by William Champ. He was made Colonial Treasurer and upon taking the position realised that the estimated budget of the state was not £330,000 but only £250,000. To fix the deficit Chapman proposed increasing taxes and reducing the wages of public servants, a proposal which reduced his popularity. After William Champ's ministry was defeated in 1857, his position as Treasurer was given to another member of parliament.

Chapman was in opposition during the Gregson, Weston and Smith ministries. Or from 1857 after Champ's resignation, until 1861.

Chapman became Premier after four years out of ministry, on 2 August 1861 he held office until 20 January 1863 a total of 18 months making him the second longest serving Premier after Francis Smith at the time. While Premier he also took up his old job of Colonial treasurer from November, 1862 until January, 1863.

Although his term as Premier ended he became Colonial Treasurer again in Richard Dry's ministry from 24 November 1866 until 1869. He also held the position in Wilson's ministry from 1869–1872. In 1873 he resigned from the House of Assembly to become a member of the Legislative Council. In August, 1873 he joined Alfred Kennerley's ministry holding the position of Colonial Secretary from 1873 until 1876. After this Chapman served in no more ministries but was President of the Tasmanian Legislative Council on 11 July 1882 until his death.

Chapman is noted as being a good public speaker and an excellent financier.

Electorates
During his time in parliament; Chapman served in six electorates, in both chambers.

Tasmanian House of Assembly
Hobart Town from 15 September 1856 until 31 May 1861.
Queenborough from 11 June 1861 until 8 November 1862.
Campbell Town from 8 November 1862 until May, 1864. Resigned because of bankruptcy
Hobart Town from 27 October 1866 until 3 December 1866.
Launceston from 31 December 1866 until August, 1871.
East Hobart from 1 September 1871 until August, 1873. Resigned to contest in Tasmanian Legislative Council.

Tasmanian Legislative Council
Buckingham from 28 October 1851 until August, 1856. Resigned to contest in the Tasmanian House of Assembly.
Buckingham from 8 August 1873 until 17 February 1884.

Notes

References

1815 births
1884 deaths
Premiers of Tasmania
Politicians from Hobart
Presidents of the Tasmanian Legislative Council
Leaders of the Opposition in Tasmania
Treasurers of Tasmania
People from Bedford
Members of the Tasmanian House of Assembly
19th-century Australian politicians
English emigrants to colonial Australia